Ro-43 may refer to:

IMAM Ro.43, an Italian reconnaissance seaplane of 1935–1943
, an Imperial Japanese Navy submarine commissioned in 1943 and sunk in 1945